Anna Maria Horner (born 1972) is an artist, author and fabric designer in Nashville, Tennessee, known for her colorful fabric designs, quilts, and sewing patterns. In addition to teaching classes and selling items globally under her namesake brand, she has written several books about sewing, quilting, and needlework. Horner has appeared on The Martha Stewart Show and been featured in Better Homes and Gardens. In May 2015 she opened Craft South, a craft store and studio in Nashville.

Horner comes from a family of artists, including painters, weavers, and knitters, and learned to sew as a child. She later attended the University of Tennessee, where she earned a fine arts degree in drawing and was introduced to patchwork quilting. Horner founded a clothing and housewares boutique called Handmaiden in 1995. She continued to designed clothes, paint and quilt. In 2001, Horner began work on her personal brand Anna Maria.

Work
Horner's fabric designs have been sold around the world. She is a designer for FreeSpirit Fabrics and serves as a curator for Anna Maria's Conservatory, collecting work by other fabric design artists. Horner is known for colorful designs that often feature geometric and floral motifs. As a quilter, Horner combines her knowledge of traditional handcraft with her fine arts degree knowledge to create new designs rooted in traditional handcraft techniques.

Books by Anna Maria Horner

 Seams to Me: 24 New Reasons to Love Sewing (2008)
 Handmade Beginnings: 24 Sewing Projects to Welcome Baby (2010)
 Anna Maria's Needleworks Notebook (2012)

References

University of Tennessee alumni
American textile designers
Quilters
21st-century American painters
21st-century women textile artists
21st-century textile artists
Embroidery designers
1972 births
Living people